What Price Loving Cup? is a 1923 British silent sports film directed by Walter West and starring Violet Hopson, James Knight and James Lindsay.

Cast
 Violet Hopson as Lady Lorimer  
 James Knight as Philip Denham  
 James Lindsay as Sir John Lorimer  
 Marjorie Benson as Tony Sheldon  
 Cecil Morton York as Earl of Dalmore  
 Arthur Walcott as Manager  
 Bob Vallis as Hireling  
 James Strackey as Trainer

References

Bibliography
 Low, Rachael. The History of the British Film 1918-1929. George Allen & Unwin, 1971.

External links
 

1923 films
1920s sports films
British horse racing films
British silent feature films
Films directed by Walter West
Films set in England
British black-and-white films
1920s English-language films
1920s British films
Silent sports films